Resurrection is a 1980 American drama film directed by Daniel Petrie, written by Lewis John Carlino, and starring Ellen Burstyn, Sam Shepard, Richard Farnsworth, Roberts Blossom, Lois Smith, and Eva Le Gallienne. It was produced by Renée Missel and Howard Rosenman. The plot involves a woman who returns to life after dying momentarily in a car crash and finds that she has the power to heal people.

The film received two nominations at the 53rd Academy Awards: Best Actress (Burstyn) and Best Supporting Actress (Eva Le Gallienne). Burstyn was also nominated for the Golden Globe Award for Best Actress - Drama at the 38th Golden Globe Awards, while Gallienne won the National Board of Review Award for Best Supporting Actress. It was further selected by the National Board of Review as one of the top ten films of 1980.

Plot
Edna Mae McCauley (Burstyn) survives a car accident that kills her husband and nearly kills her, but her brief out of body experience gives her the power to heal people. Paralyzed from the waist down, Edna returns home with her father to be cared for by family. At a party, she unwittingly heals a little girl with chronic nosebleeds, to the bewilderment of those around her. Edna eventually heals herself and slowly begins to walk again. She becomes an unwitting celebrity, the hope of those in desperate need of healing, and a lightning rod for religious beliefs and skeptics. Enda eventually begins a relationship with Cal Carpenter (Shepard) after she heals him from a stab wound he sustained in a fight, but Cal slowly becomes unstable because she does not place the healings within a religious context.

Cast
 Ellen Burstyn as Edna Mae (Harper) McCauley
 Jeffrey DeMunn as Joseph "Joe" McCauley, Edna's husband 
 Roberts Blossom as John Harper, Edna's father
 Eva Le Gallienne as Pearl, Edna's grandmother 
 Lois Smith as Kathy, Edna's cousin 
 Sam Shepard as Cal Carpenter, Edna's lover
 Richard Hamilton as Reverend Earl Carpenter, Cal's father
 Richard Farnsworth as Esco Brown, owner of "Last Chance Gas" 
 Sylvia Walden as Louise, a woman Edna heals in Los Angeles 
 Madeleine Thornton-Sherwood as Ruth, a townswoman Edna heals

Reaction

Reception

Resurrection was acclaimed by critics, and currently holds an 83% approval rating on Rotten Tomatoes based on six reviews, with an average rating of 7.50/10. AllMovie gave the film 4-stars-out-of-5 and called it "an affecting film with a brilliant performance by Ellen Burstyn," observing "very much an actor-driven film, this deliberately unflashy treatment of an emotionally charged subject is all the more persuasive for its style."

Gene Siskel and Roger Ebert gave the film a highly enthusiastic review on their weekly TV show Sneak Previews, with both critics praising Burstyn's performance and the handling of the subject matter. In his annual movie guide, Leonard Maltin rated the film 3-stars-out-of-4, and noted the story as "beautifully realized," while praising Burstyn's "moving performance" as the "centerpiece of a wonderful and underrated film."

Awards and nominations

Home media
Resurrection was released on DVD in 2010 as part of the Universal Vault Series of DVD-on-Demand titles. A Blu-ray version followed in 2019.

A restored version of the film from a new 2K scan will be released on Blu-ray with new special features by Australian label Via Vision Entertainment (Imprint) on February 22, 2023.

In other media

Book
A novelization was written by George Gipe and released in 1980.

Television
The film was remade for television in 1999. Also titled Resurrection, it was directed by Stephen Gyllenhaal and stars Dana Delany.

References

External links
 
 
 
 

1980 films
American drama films
Films about religion
Films directed by Daniel Petrie
Universal Pictures films
1980 drama films
Films scored by Maurice Jarre
Films with screenplays by Lewis John Carlino
Films about telekinesis
Films about paraplegics or quadriplegics
1980s English-language films
1980s American films